Dietmar Meisch (born 10 February 1959 in Weida, Bezirk Gera) is a retired East German race walker.

He won the bronze medal at the 1987 IAAF World Race Walking Cup, finished twentieth at the 1980 Olympic Games and ninth at the 1988 Olympic Games. Meisch represented the sports club TSC Berlin and became East German champion over 50 km in 1987.

Achievements

References

1959 births
Living people
People from Weida, Thuringia
People from Bezirk Gera
East German male racewalkers
Sportspeople from Thuringia
Olympic athletes of East Germany
Athletes (track and field) at the 1980 Summer Olympics
Athletes (track and field) at the 1988 Summer Olympics